The Adobe Font Development Kit for OpenType, also known as Adobe FDKO or simply AFDKO, is a font development kit (FDK), a set of command-line tools freely distributed by Adobe for editing and verifying OpenType fonts. It does not offer a glyph editor, but focuses on tools for manipulating font metrics, kerning and other OpenType features. AFDKO runs on Microsoft Windows, Linux and macOS, and licensed under the Apache License.

References

General
 Ken Lunde, CJKV Information Processing, Edition 2, O'Reilly Media, 2008, pp. 447–450

External links
 AFDKO – Official GitHub repository
 Typophile page on Adobe FDK

Font Development Kit
Graphics libraries
Typography software
Font editors